Kerinci Seblat National Park is the largest national park on the island of Sumatra, Indonesia. It has a total area of 13,791 km2, and spans four provinces: West Sumatra, Jambi, Bengkulu, and South Sumatra.

Geography

It is located between 100°31'18"E - 102°44'01"E and 1°07'13"S - 3°26'14"S.

The park area includes a large part of the Barisan mountain range, which form the western spine of Sumatra island and includes the highest peak in Sumatra, Mount Kerinci (3,805 m), one of more than five active volcanoes in the national park. This mainly montane park includes hot springs, rivers with rapids, caves, scenic waterfalls, and the highest caldera lake in Southeast Asia - Lake Gunung Tujuh, while the Great Sumatran fault runs through the national park making the area of great interest to geologists. The park completely encircles the populated Kerinci valley.

Flora and fauna
The park is home to diverse flora and fauna.  Over 4,000 plant species have been identified to date in the park area, including the world's largest flower, Rafflesia arnoldi, and the plant with the largest unbranched inflorescence, the titan arum.

The fauna include Sumatran tigers, and the park is recognised under the Global Tiger Initiative as one of the 12 most important protected areas in the world for tiger conservation. A recent study shows that the Kerinci Seblat National Park in central Sumatra has the highest population of tigers on the island, estimated to be at 165-190 individuals. The park also was shown to have the highest tiger occupancy rate of the protected areas, with 83% of the park showing signs of tigers. More tigers are in the Kerinci Seblat National Park than in all of Nepal, and more than in China, Laos, Cambodia, and Vietnam combined.

The national park is home for other kinds of big, medium, and small cats, clouded leopard/macan dahan (Neofelis nebulosa), marbled cat/kucing batu (Pardofelis marmorata), leopard cat/kucing hutan (Prionailurus bengalensis), and Asian golden cat/kucing emas (Catopuma temminckii). The Asian golden cats can be found everywhere in the national park, as they adapt well to various kinds of habitat, both forested and open spaces. One camera trap image gave a rare photo of a golden cat mother moving a cub to another location with her mouth.

Other highly endangered species include Sumatran dhole, Sumatran elephants, Sunda clouded leopard, Malayan tapir, and Malayan sun bear. In 2008, the International Union for Conservation of Nature  added a second species of muntjak deer to the Sumatran list of fauna with the rediscovery of the Sumatran muntjac, a deer not recorded since the late 1920s and now concluded as a new species and not subspecies. The park also protects more than 370 bird species, including the Sumatran ground-cuckoo rediscovered in the park in 2002.

The Kerinci area is home to more than 300 bird species, including 17 of Sumatra's 20 endemic birds, making it of particular importance to ornithologists and bird-watching enthusiasts.

The population of Sumatran rhinoceros in the park was estimated to number around 500 in the 1980s, but due to poaching, the Kerinci Seblat population is now considered extinct.

Conservation and threats
The national park was declared in 1982, formed from numerous watershed protection forests or hutan lindung and small nature reserves, although its borders were only legally confirmed in the late 1990s.

Together with Bukit Barisan Selatan and Gunung Leuser National Parks, it forms a World Heritage Site, Tropical Rainforest Heritage of Sumatra. Since 2011 the UNESCO also lists this world heritage as World Heritage in Danger.

Kerinci Seblat National Park is also recognised as an ASEAN Heritage Site.

Wildlife conservation program
To practicing personal relations with Sumatran elephants, Seblat Elephant Conservation Center in Bengkulu Province is the sole center which receives local and foreign students. Until June 2012, the students (volunteers) came from France, Russia, the Czech Republic, Switzerland, Belgium, and from within the country. At the 7-day course, they learn how an elephant tamer takes care of the elephants. They also help feeding and bathing the 19 elephants at the center feeding milk to a two-year-old elephant calf. The students make a report once they return to their respective home countries.

See also

 Geography of Indonesia

References

External links 
 

Protected areas of Sumatra
National parks of Indonesia
World Heritage Sites in Indonesia
ASEAN heritage parks
Protected areas established in 1999
Geography of West Sumatra
Geography of Jambi
Geography of Bengkulu
Geography of South Sumatra
Tourist attractions in West Sumatra
Tourist attractions in Jambi
Tourist attractions in Bengkulu
Tourist attractions in South Sumatra
1999 establishments in Indonesia